Nightwind: An Erroll Garner Songbook is an album by the pianist John Hicks, recorded in 1997 and released on the HighNote label. The album contains 10 compositions by Erroll Garner along with a tribute by Hicks.

Reception
AllMusic stated that "Hicks' tribute to the late Erroll Garner emphasizes the song writing brilliance that is overshadowed by the huge success of his classic 'Misty' ...  John Hicks has done a service to jazz fans by exploring the music of Erroll Garner in greater detail". JazzTimes wrote: "Hicks is a very different pianist than Garner: his left hand carries subtle dynamic shadings, where Garner's was all about time. He shares with Garner a reverence for melody and a sense of musical destination that gives form to his improvisations".

Track listing 
All compositions by Erroll Garner except as indicated
 "Tribute to EG" (John Hicks) - 2:59 		 	
 "Misty" - 6:23 		
 "Paris Cries" - 4:24 		
 "Paris Lover" - 5:25 		
 "Night Wind" - 3:29 		
 "Left Bank Swing" - 3:40 		
 "Passing Through" - 4:04 		
 "Something Happens" - 7:06
 "Solitaire" (Steve Allen, Erroll Garner) - 4:58
 "It Gets Better Every Time" - 4:02
 "Dreamy" - 6:44

Personnel 
John Hicks - piano
Dwayne Dolphin - bass
Cecil Brooks III - drums

Production
Cecil Brooks III - producer
George Heid - engineer

References 

John Hicks (jazz pianist) albums
1999 albums
HighNote Records albums
Tribute albums